Eom Par-Yong or Um Pal-Yong (9 July 1931 – 24 January 1995) was a South Korean sprinter. He competed in the men's 200 metres at the 1952 Summer Olympics.

References

1931 births
1995 deaths
Athletes (track and field) at the 1952 Summer Olympics
South Korean male sprinters
Olympic athletes of South Korea
Place of birth missing